Homo homini lupus is the second album by Italian progressive rock band Locanda delle Fate. It was recorded more than 20 years after the first album of the band, taking advantage of the progressive-rock "revivalist" trend that emerged in Italy in the 1990s.

Track listing
 "Homo homini lupus" (5:08)
 "Il lato sporco di noi" (5:10)
 "Giro tondo" (4:20)
 "Bandando" (1:10)
 "Plovi barko" (3:46)
 "Stanotte Dio cosa fa?" (5:47)
 "La fine" (5:21)
 "Certe cose" (6:02)
 "Ojkitawe" (5:10)
 "I giardini di Hiroshima" (5:06)
 "Fumo" (8:22)

Personnel
 Giorgio Gardino - drums and percussion
 Luciano Boero - bass, fretless, backing vocals
 Ezio Vevey - guitars, mandolin, voice
 Alberto Gaviglio - guitars, flute, voice
 Michele Conta - piano (in "Ojkitawe")
 Oscar Mazzoglio - keyboards, accordion, backing vocals

See also
Homo homini lupus

La Locanda delle Fate albums
2000 albums